Crispina Inès Andrade Correia (born November 5, 1975) is a former Cape Verdean female basketball player.

External links
Profile at fiba.com

1975 births
Living people
Sportspeople from Praia
Cape Verdean women's basketball players
C.D. Primeiro de Agosto women's basketball players
Centers (basketball)